The politics of Tuscany, Italy take place in the framework of a semi-presidential representative democracy, whereby the President of the Region is the head of government, and of a pluriform multi-party system. Legislative power is vested in the Regional Council of Tuscany, while executive power is exercised by the Regional Government led by the President, who is directly elected by the people. The current Statute, which regulates the functioning of the regional institutions, has been in force since 2005.

Prior to the rise of Fascism, most of the deputies elected in Tuscany were part of the liberal establishment (see Historical Right, Historical Left and Liberals), which governed Italy for decades. Florence and the southern provinces of the region were anyway an early stronghold of the Italian Socialist Party (PSI). At the 1924 general election, which opened the way to the Fascist authoritarian rule, Tuscany was one of the regions where the National Fascist Party (PNF) obtained more than 70% of the vote.

After World War II, Tuscany became a stronghold of the Italian Communist Party (PCI), which was especially strong in rural areas. The PCI and its successors have governed the region since 1970. The region is now a stronghold of the "centre-left coalition" led by the Democratic Party (PD), like the other regions of the so-called "Red belt".

The centre-left coalition has governed the region since 1995, under President Eugenio Giani since 2020.

Legislative branch

The Regional Council of Tuscany is composed of 41 members.

Councillors are elected in provincial constituencies by proportional representation using the D'Hondt method. The Florence constituency is further divided into 4 sub-constituencies. Preferential voting is allowed: a maximum of two preferences can be expressed for candidates of the same party list and provided the two chosen candidates are of different gender. In this system parties are grouped in alliances, supporting a candidate for the post of President of Tuscany. The candidate receiving at least 40% of the votes is elected to the post and his/her list (or the coalition) is awarded a majority bonus in the Regional Council. If no candidate gets more than 40% of the votes, a run-off is held fourteen days after, with only the two top candidates from the first round allowed. The winning candidate is assured a majority in the Regional Council.

The Council is elected for a five-year term, but, if the President suffers a vote of no confidence, resigns or dies, under the simul stabunt, simul cadent clause introduced in 1999 (literally they will stand together or they will fall together), also the Council is dissolved and a snap election is called.

2020–2025 composition

Executive branch

The Regional Government (Giunta Regionale) is presided by the President of the Region (Presidente della Regione), who is elected for a five-year term, and is currently composed by nine members: the President and 8 regional ministers or assessors (Assessori), including a Vice President (Vice Presidente).

Current composition
The current Regional Government was sworn in on 21 October 2020.

List of presidents

The current President of Tuscany is Eugenio Giani, who is serving his first term after winning the 2020 regional election.

Local government

Provinces

Tuscany is divided in ten provinces, which are a traditional form of local administration in the region.

The four main functions devolved to the provinces are:
 local planning and zoning;
 maintenance of public high school buildings;
 provision of local police and fire services;
 transportation regulation (car registration, maintenance of local roads, etc.).

From 1945 to 1995 presidents of the provinces were chosen by the members of the Provincial Councils, legislative bodies elected every five years by citizens. From 1995 to 2014, under provisions of the 1993 local administration reform, presidents of the provinces of Tuscany were chosen by popular election, originally every four, then every five years.

On 3 April 2014, the Italian Chamber of Deputies gave its final approval to the Law n.56/2014 which involved the transformation of the Italian provinces into "institutional bodies of second level". According to the 2014 reform, now each province is headed by a President (or Commissioner) assisted by a legislative body, the Provincial Council, and an executive body, the Provincial Executive. President (Commissioner) and members of Council are elected together by mayors and city councillors of each municipality of the province respectively every four and two years. The Executive is chaired by the President (Commissioner) who appoint others members, called assessori. Since 2015, the President (Commissioner) and other members of the Council do not receive a salary.

Socialist and communist ideas had an early diffusion in quite all the provinces around World War I. After the Fascist parenthesis, left-wing parties found their strongholds in eastern rural provinces, especially Siena and Arezzo, while Christian Democracy used to be strong in the north-western part of the Region.

The Province of Florence is now one of the major national strongholds of Democratic Party. The Province of Siena is also called the "red province of Italy", because the Italian Communist Party has always governed it with the 60% of the votes since 1945 to the dissolution of the party in 1991.

Municipalities
Tuscany is also divided in 287 comuni (municipalities), which have even more history, having been established in the Middle Ages when they were the main places of government. 18 comuni (10 provincial capitals) have more than 45,000 inhabitants, a large majority of which are ruled by the centre-left coalition.

Provincial capitals:

Other municipalities with more than 45,000 inhabitants:

Parties and elections

Latest regional election

In the latest regional election, which took place on 20–21 September 2020, Eugenio Giani of the Democratic Party (PD) was elected President, by beating Susanna Ceccardi of Lega Nord 48.6% to 40.5%. The PD was by far the largest party with 34% of the vote.

See also
Politics of Italy

References

External links
Tuscany Region
Regional Council of Tuscany
Constitution of Tuscany

 
Tuscany